Events from the year 1791 in Ireland.

Incumbent
Monarch: George III

Events
September – Wolfe Tone publishes Argument on Behalf of the Catholics of Ireland.
14 October – the Northern Whig Club, a group of nine Belfast Presbyterians, meets with Wolfe Tone and Thomas Russell and forms the Society of United Irishmen to press for liberal non-denominational parliamentary reform.
7 November – The Custom House in Dublin opens for business, having been completed under the supervision of James Gandon.

The Grand Canal opens to a junction with the Barrow at Athy.
The first bridge across the River Foyle at Derry, built by the American Lemuel Cox in wood, is opened to vehicular traffic.

Births
6 March – John MacHale, Roman Catholic Archbishop of Tuam, Irish Nationalist and writer (died 1881).
17 August – Richard Lalor Sheil, politician, writer and orator (died 1851).
14 December – Charles Wolfe, poet (died 1823).
Full date unknown
James Graham, soldier, commended for his gallantry during the Battle of Waterloo (died 1845).

Deaths
2 December – Henry Flood, statesman (born 1732).
Full date unknown
George Bryan, businessman, statesman and politician in Pennsylvania (born 1731).
Robert Carver, artist (b. c1730).

References

 
Years of the 18th century in Ireland
Ireland
1790s in Ireland